Turkey took part in the Eurovision Song Contest 1990. The country was represented by Kayahan (vocals by Demet Sağıroğlu) with the song "Gözlerinin Hapsindeyim" written and composed by Kayahan.

Before Eurovision

14. Eurovision Şarkı Yarışması Türkiye Finali 
The final took place on 24 February 1990 at the Ari TV studios in Ankara, hosted by Korhan Abay.  Fifteen songs competed and the winner was determined by the votes of eight regional juries. This contest was the
only contest where everything is played entirely live. Despite the instruments shown on stage, they are all required to play live. The three previous editions (1987, 1988, 1989) allowed playback as long as there was an instrument presented on stage.

The national final version of the song "Gözlerinin Hapsindeyim" is different from the version performed at the Eurovision Song Contest. According to Eroğlu, the TRT had a special budget ready when they decided they wanted their song to be improved. They hired Jean Claudric to rearrange the song. However, due to limited time, only some parts were made. Eroğlu used Jean's version and made an orchestration out of it for the contest. Most of the members in Kayahan's band preferred Eroğlu's old arrangement.

At Eurovision
On the night of the contest Kayahan performed 4th in the running order following Belgium and preceding The Netherlands. At the close of the voting the song had received 21 points placing Turkey 17th. 5 participants had voted for "Gözlerinin hapsindeyim". The Turkish jury awarded its 12 points to Yugoslavia.

The members of the Turkish jury included Murat Türkoğlu, Selda Güneş, Mithat Kaya, Özlem Şen, Sıla Yavuz, Nazif Eke, Hülya Okçay, Kadir Gökdemir, Aydan Özbey, Özlem Çelik, Ziya Fırat Doğançay, Meltem Altınörs, Nihal Müftüoğlu, Zeki Tatlıgil, Ahmet Hüseyin Uluçay, and Mustafa Sarıkoç.

Voting

References

1990
Countries in the Eurovision Song Contest 1990
Eurovision